Musselburgh railway station is a railway station serving the town of Musselburgh, East Lothian near Edinburgh in Scotland. It is located near the recently built campus of the Queen Margaret University.

Two stations of the same name were opened by North British Railway. The 1st station opened in June 1846, which was renamed a year later as Inveresk railway station in July 1847. It closed in May 1964. The 2nd Musselburgh station opened in July 1847 and was located alongside the River Esk on its own branch line. That station serviced the Edinburgh and Dalkeith line to Fisherrow. It was closed to passenger services in September 1964 and goods services in December 1970.

Facilities

The station currently has two platforms.

Both have waiting shelters, CIS screens and customer help points.  Platform 2 also has a self-service ticket machine in its shelter, to allow intending passengers to purchase prior to travel or collect pre-paid tickets (the station is otherwise unmanned). Train running information is also provided via automatic announcements and timetable posters. Step-free access is available to each platform.

Services

Monday to Friday daytimes there is an hourly service westbound to Edinburgh (with peak-time services carrying on to Haymarket) and eastbound to North Berwick with a half-hourly service on Saturdays. On evenings and Sundays there is an hourly service in each direction. On Monday to Saturdays there is a bi-hourly and late night limited stop service that runs from Edinburgh Waverley to  that stops at Musselburgh. There is also a limited service to and from Glasgow Central and Ayr (via ) on Mondays–Saturdays.

Transport links
Lothian Buses service numbers 30, N30 and 45 stop near the station.

See also
List of places in East Lothian
List of places in Scotland

References

External links
Video footage and history of the station

Railway stations in East Lothian
Railway stations served by ScotRail
Railway stations in Great Britain opened in 1988
Railway stations opened by British Rail
Musselburgh
1988 establishments in Scotland